Nargesi (also Romanized as  Nargesī; also known as Narges and Nargesi Morgha) is a village in Tolbozan Rural District, Golgir District, Masjed Soleyman County, Khuzestan Province, Iran. At the 2006 census, its population was 71, in 16 families.

References 

Populated places in Masjed Soleyman County